Morgan Sparks (July 6, 1916 – May 3, 2008) was an American scientist and engineer who helped develop the microwatt bipolar junction transistor in 1951, which was a critical step in making transistors usable for every-day electronics. Sparks directed Sandia National Laboratories.

Early life and education

Sparks was born in Pagosa Springs, Colorado and earned his BA and MA degrees, both in chemistry, at Rice University. He then did his PhD work in physical chemistry at the University of Illinois, Urbana.

Career
Sparks went on to work at Bell Labs where John Bardeen, Walter Brattain and William Shockley were developing the first transistor. Sparks stayed at Bell Labs and worked there to develop the microwatt bipolar junction transistor which helped make transistors practical enough for common use. Later, Sparks left Bell Labs to become the director of Sandia National Laboratories.

See also
 History of the transistor

References

External links
 Obituary: NY Times
 Obituary: Times

1916 births
2008 deaths
People from Pagosa Springs, Colorado
Rice University alumni
University of Illinois Urbana-Champaign alumni
United States Department of Energy National Laboratories personnel
20th-century American engineers
Scientists at Bell Labs
Sandia National Laboratories people